Sue Jacobs (born 1950 – 13 July 2012) was a dual New Zealand international, having represented the country in both softball and football. Jacobs played under the Auckland Metro Club for both sports, and represented Auckland in both in the national competitions.

Softball

Club career
Jacobs played for Auckland Metro Softball Club and was named "Auckland Softballer of the Year" in 1972–1973 and 1974–1975. She toured with the club to Australia in 1974–1975. She represented Auckland in the national competition for eleven straight seasons, winning six titles in her first seven years.

International career
Jacobs was a New Zealand women's international softball player from 1976 to 1978.

Football

Club career
Jacobs played for Metro in football, when the softball team decided to form a football team as well. They played in the local Auckland competition from 1973. She also represented the Auckland province eight times after making her debut in a 3–0 loss to Wellington in 1974.

International career
Jacobs was a member of New Zealand's first ever women's team who was invited to play at the 1975 AFC Women's Championship however she didn't end up taking the field. She did end up representing New Zealand, in football, thirteen times between 1975 and 1977.

Honours

New Zealand
AFC Women's Championship: 1975

References

External links
New Zealand White Sox Test Caps

New Zealand women's association footballers
New Zealand women's international footballers
Women's association football goalkeepers
New Zealand softball players